The 2012 Big Ten men's basketball tournament was held from March 8 through March 11 at Bankers Life Fieldhouse in Indianapolis. This was the first tournament to feature 12 teams of the expanded Big Ten, with Nebraska making its debut. The tournament was the fifteenth annual Big Ten men's basketball tournament. The championship was won by Michigan State who defeated Ohio State in the championships game. As a result, Michigan State received the Big Ten's automatic bid to the NCAA tournament. The win marked Michigan State's third tournament championship and first since 2000.

Seeds
All Big Ten schools played in the tournament. Teams were seeded by conference record, with a tiebreaker system used to seed teams with identical conference records. Seeding for the tournament was determined at the close of the regular conference season. A new tie-breaking procedure was announced for the 2012 tournament for teams with identical conference records.  The top 4 teams received a first-round bye.

Schedule
Source

Attendance figures; Total Tournament Attendance:107,737

Bracket

Honors

All-Tournament Team
 Draymond Green, Michigan State – Big Ten tournament Most Outstanding Player
 Brandon Wood, Michigan State
 Andre Hollins, Minnesota
 Jared Sullinger, Ohio State
 Deshaun Thomas, Ohio State

Tournament notes
 For the third year in a row, the No. 1 seed won the Big Ten tournament, but this would be the last time for years to come.
 There were only two upsets in this tournament, the biggest being No. 10 seed, Minnesota, over No. 7 seed, Northwestern.

References

Big Ten men's basketball tournament
Tournament
Big Ten Conference men's basketball tournament
Big Ten men's basketball tournament
Big Ten